The Exile is an American television series that aired on CBS as part of its late night Crimetime After Primetime line up. The series premiered on April 2, 1991 and ran episodes in its first single-season run through October 1991. The series was rerun as part of CBS's Crimetime After Primetime lineup from April 1993 through June 1995.

Plot
The series follows the adventures of John Phillips, an intelligence agent working undercover for the Defense Clandestine Service (DCS) in Eastern Europe, who is framed for murder by a DCS double agent and branded a traitor. With the help of his friends, Charles Cabot, cultural affairs attaché to the U.S. embassy in Paris, and Danny Montreau, a colonel in France's Special Action Directorate, Phillips's death is faked and he is given a new identity as John Stone. As John Stone, he works on covert special assignments while trying to clear his name. In his new life, John also interacts with his pretty landlord, Jacquie Decaux, an artist who runs a garage specializing in exotic cars.

Cast
 Jeffrey Meek as John Stone/Phillips
 Christian Burgess as Charles Cabot
 Patrick Floershim as Danny Montreau
 Nadia Fares as Jacquie Decaux

Episodes

References

External links

CBS original programming
1991 American television series debuts
1991 American television series endings
1990s American drama television series
English-language television shows